Jorge Antonio Solis (May 1, 1951 – October 8, 2021) was a former United States District Judge and former Chief Judge of the United States District Court for the Northern District of Texas.

Education and career

Born in San Ygnacio, Texas, Solis received a Bachelor of Arts degree from McMurry College in 1973 and a Juris Doctor from the University of Texas School of Law in 1976. He was an assistant criminal district attorney of  the Taylor County Criminal District Attorney's Office in Abilene, Taylor County, Texas from 1976 to 1981. He was in private practice from 1981 to 1982, after which he returned to the Taylor County Criminal District Attorney's Office as a criminal district attorney from 1983 to 1987. He was a special prosecutor for the Narcotics Task Force in 1988. Solis then served as a Judge of the 350th District Court of Texas from 1989 to 1991.

Federal judicial service

On June 19, 1991, Solis was nominated by President George H. W. Bush to a seat on the United States District Court for the Northern District of Texas vacated by Judge Robert William Porter. Solis was confirmed by the United States Senate on September 12, 1991, and received his commission on September 16, 1991. He became Chief Judge on November 13, 2014. He served as Chief Judge until he retired on May 1, 2016.

See also
List of Hispanic/Latino American jurists

References

Sources
FJC Bio

1951 births
2021 deaths
Hispanic and Latino American judges
Judges of the United States District Court for the Northern District of Texas
McMurry University alumni
United States district court judges appointed by George H. W. Bush
20th-century American judges
University of Texas School of Law alumni
People from Zapata County, Texas